Kramgoa låtar 18 is a 1990 Vikingarna studio album.

Track listing
Till mitt eget Blue Hawaii
Vägen hem
Rumba i Balders Hage
Min arm omkring din hals
Ett litet rosa band
Allt beror på dej
Love Me Tender
Gammal kärlek rostar aldrig
Förlora aldrig tron på kärleken
Minns du den sommar (Greenfields)
Sommardansen går
Du försvann som en vind
Wonderful Land (instrumental)
Grindpojken
Jag räknar dagarna
All Shook Up

Charts

References

1990 albums
Vikingarna (band) albums
Swedish-language albums